This list of shipwrecks in 1908 includes ships sunk, foundered, grounded, or otherwise lost during 1908.

January

1 January

2 January

3 January

4 January

7 January

8 January

9 January

10 January

11 January

12 January

13 January

14 January

15 January

17 January

18 January

19 January

20 January

22 January

23 January

24 January

25 January

26 January

27 January

28 January

29 January

30 January

31 January

Unknown date

February

1 February

2 February

3 February

4 February

5 February

6 February

7 February

8 February

8 February

10 February

11 February

13 February

14 February

15 February

18 February

19 February

21 February

Unknown date

March

3 March

7 March

8 March

12 March

13 March

14 March

16 March

17 March

20 March

21 March

23 March

25 March

28 March

29 March

30 March

31 March

April

2 April

4 April

6 April

7 April

8 April

9 April

10 April

11 April

12 April

13 April

14 April

15 April

16 April

18 April

19 April

20 April

21 April

23 April

24 April

25 April

26 April

27 April

28 April

29 April

30 April

Unknown date

May

1 May

2 May

3 May

6 May

8 May

10 May

11 May

13 May

14 May

15 May

17 May

20 May

22 May

23 May

24 May

25 May

26 May

27 May

28 May

29 May

30 May

31 May

June

1 June

3 June

6 June

7 June

8 June

16 June

17 June

20 June

21 June

23 June

25 June

26 June

27 June

30 June

July

1 July

5 July

6 July

7 July

8 July

14 July

17 July

18 July

20 July

21 July

22 July

23 July

24 July

25 July

26 July

27 July

28 July

29 July

30 July

31 July

August

1 August

4 August

5 August

7 August

8 August

9 August

11 August

12 August

13 August

14 August

15 August

16 August

17 August

18 August

19 August

20 August

22 August

23 August

24 August

26 August

27 August

28 August

29 August

September

1 September

2 September

3 September

4 September

5 September

6 September

9 September

11 September

13 September

14 September

15 September

16 September

17 September

18 September

19 September

20 September

21 September

23 September

25 September

26 September

27 September

28 September

29 September

30 September

October

1 October

2 October

3 October

4 October

5 October

7 October

9 October

12 October

14 October

15 October

17 October

18 October

19 October

20 October

21 October

22 October

23 October

24 October

26 October

28 October

29 October

30 October

31 October

Unknown date

November

1 November

2 November

3 November

4 November

5 November

6 November

7 November

11 November

12 November

14 November

15 November

16 November

18 November

20 November

21 November

22 November

23 November

24 November

25 November

26 November

28 November

29 November

30 November

Unknown November

December

1 December

2 December

3 December

4 December

5 December

6 December

7 December

8 December

9 December

11 December

12 December

13 December

14 December

15 December

16 December

17 December

18 December

20 December

21 December

22 December

24 December

25 December

26 December

28 December

29 December

30 December

31 December

Unknown date

Unknown date

References

1908
 
Ship